The Museum of Ivo Andrić is a museum located in Belgrade, the capital of Serbia. Founded on 10 October 1976, it is dedicated to the Nobel prize winning writer Ivo Andrić. It is operated by the Belgrade City Museum.

The library contains 4,502 bibliographical units, rich collection of photographs, numerous Andrić's personal holdings, and writer's study room and the salon, with authentic atmosphere since Andrić's time.

History
The Museum was founded on 10 October 1976 under the decree of the Ministry for Science and Culture of Serbia. It is located in apartment where Ivo Andrić lived from 1958 until his death.

Gallery

See also
 Tourism in Serbia

References

External links
 

Museums in Belgrade
Museums established in 1976
Literary museums in Serbia
Museum of Ivo Andric
Ivo Andrić